Silas Billong (born 13 September 1974 in Lyon, France) is a French former professional footballer who played as a defender. He made 27 appearances and scored one goal for Reims in Ligue 2 in the 2002–03 season.  His brother Romarin is also a former footballer. After his retirement from playing, Billong became a referee.

References

1974 births
Living people
French footballers
Footballers from Lyon
Association football defenders